The Individual Women event was held on July 25.

Results

References

Individuel Women
2009 in women's gymnastics